Teresa Brewer (born Theresa Veronica Breuer; May 7, 1931 – October 17, 2007) was an American singer whose style incorporated pop, country, jazz, R&B, musicals, and novelty songs. She was one of the most prolific and popular female singers of the 1950s, recording nearly 600 songs.

Early life
Brewer was born in Toledo, Ohio, the eldest of five siblings. Her father Ludwig Brauer, a German immigrant, was a glass inspector for the Libbey Owens Company (now part of Pilkington Glass), and her mother Helen (nee Katsap) Brauer, a housewife, was of Polish ancestry. The family were practicing Catholics, and she was a member of the Roman Catholic Church most of her life.

Career
Her showbiz career began almost as soon as she was able to walk and talk. At the age of 2, her mother entered her in The Uncle August Kiddie Show on Toledo's WSPD and she was a hit with audiences. At the age of 7, Brewer entered The Major Bowles Amateur Hour and was soon touring around the country with them. At 12, her mother pulled her from the road to finish school. She went to New York City with an aunt in 1947 and began singing in nightclubs at just 16. It was there that she met her husband Bill Monahan.

An agent, Richie Lisella, heard her sing and took her career in hand, and soon she was signed to a contract with London Records. In 1949 she recorded the song Copenhagen (a jazz perennial) with the Dixieland All-Stars along with a number of other recordings. For the B side she recorded the song "Music! Music! Music!". Unexpectedly, it was not the A side but the B side which took off, selling over a million copies and becoming Teresa's signature song. Another novelty song, "Choo'n Gum", hit the top 20 in 1950, followed by "Molasses, Molasses." Like many singers, she preferred ballads as they offered more opportunity to show off her vocal abilities, but the only ballad she recorded to make the charts was "Longing for You" in 1951.

In 1951 Brewer switched labels, going to Coral Records. Since she never learned to read music, she had demos sent to her to learn the melodies of the songs she would record. She had a number of hits for Coral and rerecorded "Music! Music! Music!" with the new label (and would record it a third time for a Europe-only greatest hits collection in 1962). In 1952, she recorded "You'll Never Get Away" in a duet with Don Cornell, followed in 1953 by her best selling hit, "Till I Waltz Again with You". In the mid-1950s she did a number of covers of rhythm and blues songs like "Pledging My Love" and "Tweedle Dee". She covered some country songs including "Jilted", "I Gotta Go Get My Baby", and "Let Me Go, Lover!". In 1956 she co-wrote "I Love Mickey", about New York Yankees center fielder Mickey Mantle, who appeared on the record with Brewer. It was also reported that the two had developed a mutual attraction. Another 1956 hit was Brewer's syncopated rendition of "Mutual Admiration Society". In the same year her hit "A Sweet Old Fashioned Girl" demonstrated in one song her ballad and rock talents. In 1957 she recorded more covers: of country song "Teardrops in My Heart" and R&B songs "You Send Me" and "Empty Arms".

"Teresa Brewer Showcase" was the first LP she released; it was a collection of several of her early recordings with London Records but did not include her two hits "Music! Music! Music!" or "Choo 'n Gum." Most of the albums she released with Coral over the 1950s were typical LPs of the era, featuring more collections of songs and cover versions rather than thematic ideas--one exception was the Catholic-flavored Christmas album "At Christmas Time" (1957). The last charting hit she had was "Milord" in 1961. Brewer continued releasing albums throughout the 1960s but the British invasion quickly eliminated most interest in older singers and her record sales dwindled.

She appeared as a special guest star on The Muppet Show in 1977 and made an appearance on The Statler Brothers Show in 1993.

She appeared as Pat Edmonds in the 1953 film musical Those Redheads from Seattle – she was a natural redhead herself. Her song from the film, "Baby Baby Baby", was successful as a single. She appeared on television as a guest star on such television shows as The Muppet Show and Sha Na Na. In 1968, Brewer sang "The Star-Spangled Banner" at the 1968 MLB All Star Game.  She released "Danny's Song" (written by Kenny Loggins) in 1972 (album, Singin' a Doo Dah Song), in 1975 (album, Teresa Brewer – Her Greatest Hits), in 1986 (album, Portrait) and, again in 1991 (album, Sixteen Most Requested Songs)

Later career
Brewer re-emerged as a jazz vocalist on Bob Thiele's Amsterdam label in the 1980s and 1990s, recording a number of albums including tribute albums to Bessie Smith, Louis Armstrong, Fats Waller and Irving Berlin. She also recorded with such jazz greats as Count Basie, Duke Ellington, Dizzy Gillespie, Earl Hines, Svend Asmussen and Bobby Hackett. A landmark recording in her career was Softly I Swing (Red Baron Records, 1992) which was produced by Thiele and featured David Murray, Ron Carter, Kenny Barron and Grady Tate. Memories of Louis, also recorded for Thiele's Red Baron Records, paired her with a different well-known trumpeter on each track, including Clark Terry, Nicholas Payton, Ruby Braff, Freddie Hubbard, Wynton Marsalis, Roy Hargrove, Sweets Edison, Lew Soloff, Terence Blanchard, Yank Lawson, Red Rodney and Dizzy Gillespie.

Thiele died in 1996, and Brewer never recorded after that. Altogether, she had recorded nearly 600 song titles.

Personal life
Teresa married William "Bill" Monahan in 1949; the couple had four daughters, Kathleen, Susan, Megan and Michelle. They eventually separated, and the marriage was dissolved in 1972 shortly before she married Bob Thiele.

Honors 
For her contribution to the recording industry, Teresa Brewer has a star on the Hollywood Walk of Fame at 1708 Vine Street. In 2007, she was inducted into the Hit Parade Hall of Fame.

Death 
Brewer died of a neuromuscular disease, progressive supranuclear palsy (PSP), at her home on Pinebrook Boulevard in New Rochelle, New York, aged 76. Her funeral was held at Holy Name of Jesus Church in New Rochelle, New York, where she was a member. Her remains were given to her daughter.

Influences 
One of Elvis Presley's first public singing experiences in 12th grade was performing a song of Brewer's: "Till I Waltz Again with You".

Discography

Singles

References

External links
Teresa Brewer Center
Teresa Brewer page on  Olde Time Cooking & Nostalgia site

Teresa Brewer Coral singles
Teresa Brewer in the 1960s
Teresa Brewer's early recordings
 Teresa Brewer recordings at the Discography of American Historical Recordings.

1931 births
2007 deaths
American women pop singers
Coral Records artists
London Records artists
Philips Records artists
RCA Records artists
Singers from Ohio
Musicians from Toledo, Ohio
Musicians from New Rochelle, New York
Traditional pop music singers
Red Baron Records artists
20th-century American singers
20th-century American women singers
Catholics from New York (state)
Catholics from Ohio
Neurological disease deaths in New York (state)
Deaths from progressive supranuclear palsy